William Patrick Hughes  (born June 2, 1947) is a former American football linebacker who played ten seasons in the National Football League (NFL) for the New York Giants and the New Orleans Saints.  He played college football at Boston University.  Hughes was an outstanding high school athlete and was drafted by the New York Mets.  He originally signed to attend Ohio State but instead was pushed to West Point.  In order to gain entrance into West Point he was sent to Valley Forge Military Academy.  He left after a few weeks and ended up at Boston University.  He captained the BU team in 1969 and, along with Bruce Taylor, led the Terriers to the only Bowl game in their history.

1947 births
Living people
Sportspeople from Everett, Massachusetts
American football linebackers
Boston University Terriers football players
New York Giants players
New Orleans Saints players
Players of American football from Massachusetts